Piezasteria is a genus of beetles in the family Cerambycidae, containing the following species:

 Piezasteria helenae Martins, 1985
 Piezasteria sternalis Martins, 1976

References

Piezocerini